BM-1 can refer to:

TOS-1, a Russian multiple-rocket launcher
USS Puritan (BM-1), a United States monitor
BM1 (New York City bus), a bus route in New York City